Norham railway station served the village of Norham, Northumberland, England, from 1849 to 1965 on the Kelso Branch.

History 
The station opened on 27 July 1849 by the York, Newcastle and Berwick Railway.It was situated on Norham Road Station off the B6470. It didn't attract many passengers but the goods yard was busy throughout its life. A signal box was built on the down platform in 1880 but it closed in January 1902, being replaced by another near the ramp of the up platform. On the down side were five sidings; one served a coal depot and two served a lime depot. Another siding to the south served a goods warehouse and another served a dock. The station was later downgraded to an unstaffed halt and the down platform was shortened to provide easier access for the signal box. The station closed to passengers on 15 June 1964 and closed to goods traffic on 29 March 1965.

References

External links 

Disused railway stations in Northumberland
Former North Eastern Railway (UK) stations
Beeching closures in England
Railway stations in Great Britain closed in 1964
1849 establishments in England
1965 disestablishments in England
Railway stations in Great Britain opened in 1849
railway station